Mozart Camargo Guarnieri (February 1, 1907 – January 13, 1993) was a Brazilian composer.

Name
Guarnieri was born in Tietê, São Paulo, and registered at birth as Mozart Guarnieri, but when he began a musical career, he decided his first name was too pretentious. Thus he adopted his mother's maiden name Camargo as a middle name, and thenceforth signed himself M. Camargo Guarnieri. In 1948, he legally changed his name to Mozart Camargo Guarnieri, but continued to sign only the initial of his first name. Guarnieri's Italian father, Michele Guarneri, a lover of classical music, named one of Camargo's brothers Rossine (a Portuguese misspelling of Rossini), and two others Verdi and Bellini.

Life
In 1938, a fellowship from the Council of Artistic Orientation allowed him to travel to Paris, where he studied composition and aesthetics with Charles Koechlin and conducting with François Ruhlmann. Some of his compositions received important prizes in the United States in the 1940s, giving Guarnieri the opportunity of conducting them in New York, Boston, Los Angeles and Chicago. A distinguished figure of the Brazilian national school, he served in several capacities; conductor of the São Paulo Orchestra, member of the Academia Brasileira de Música, and Director of the São Paulo Conservatório, where he taught composition and orchestral conducting. In 1936 he was the first conductor of the Coral Paulistano choir. His œuvre comprises symphonies, concertos, cantatas, two operas, chamber music, many piano pieces, and over fifty songs. In 1972, in Porto Alegre, his compatriot Roberto Szidon gave the first performance of the Piano Concerto No. 4. Some consider him to be the most important Brazilian composer after Heitor Villa-Lobos. Shortly before his death in São Paulo in 1993, he was awarded the Gabriela Mistral Prize by the Organization of American States as the greatest contemporary composer of the Americas.

Works

Operas
Pedro Malazarte (comic opera in one act, libretto by Mário de Andrade, premiered in May 1952 at the Theatro Municipal (Rio de Janeiro))
Um homem só (tragic opera in one act, libretto by Gianfrancesco Guarnieri, premiered on November 29, 1962, at the Theatro Municipal (Rio de Janeiro))

Orchestral
Symphonies
Symphony No. 1 (1944)
Symphony No. 2 "Uirapuru" (1945)
Symphony No. 3 (1952)
Symphony No. 4 "Brasília" (1963)
Symphony No. 5 (1977)
Symphony No. 6 (1981)
Overtures
Abertura Concertante (1942)
Abertura Festiva (1971)
Suites
Suite infantil (1929)
Tres Dansas para Orquestra (1941). The first dance is "Dansa Brasileira" (originally composed for piano in 1928), which is his best-known and most-recorded piece outside South America.
Suite IV Centenario (1954)
Suite Vila Rica (1957), taken from the music for the film "Rebelião em Vila Rica"
Homenagem a Villa-Lobos (1966) for Winds, Piano and Percussion
Concerto for Orchestra and Percussion (1972)

Concertante
Piano
Piano Concerto No. 1 (1931)
Piano Concerto No. 2 (1946)
Chôro for piano and orchestra (1956)
Piano Concerto No. 3 (1964)
Seresta for Piano and Orchestra (1965)
Piano Concerto No. 4 (1968)
Piano Concerto No. 5 (1970)
Piano Concerto No. 6 (1987)
Variations (Variações sobre um tema nordestino) for Piano and Orchestra (1953)
Violin
Violin Concerto No. 1 (1940). This concerto won a Latin-American violin concerto contest in 1943 sponsored by the Pan American Union, prize money donated by Samuel Fels.
Chôro for violin and orchestra (1951)
Violin Concerto No. 2 (1952)
Viola
Chôro for viola and orchestra (1975)
Cello
Chôro for cello and orchestra (1961)
Flute
Chôro for Flute and Chamber Orchestra (1972)
Clarinet
Chôro for Clarinet and Orchestra (1956)
Bassoon
Chôro for Bassoon and Chamber Orchestra (1991)

Chamber/instrumental
String quartets
String Quartet No. 1 (1932)
String Quartet No. 2 (1944)
String Quartet No. 3 (1962)
Cello sonatas
Cello Sonata No. 1 (1931)
Cello Sonata No. 2 (1955)
Cello Sonata No. 3 (1977)
Violin sonatas
Violin Sonata No. 1 (? apparently lost in a taxi)
Violin Sonata No. 2 (1933)
Violin Sonata No. 3 (1950)
Violin Sonata No. 4 (1956)
Violin Sonata No. 5 (1959)
Violin Sonata No. 6 (1965)
Violin Sonata No. 7 (1977–1978)
Canção Sertaneja for Violin and Piano (1955)
Viola Sonata (1950)
Sonatina for Flute and Piano (1947)
Flor de Tremembe, for Fifteen Instruments and Percussion (1960)

Piano
Dança Brasileira (1928)
Dança Selvagem (1931)
Ponteios, Book I (1931–35)
Dança Negra (1946)
Ponteios, Book II (1947–49)
Estudo No. 1 (1949)
Estudo No. 2 (1949)
Estudo No. 3 (1949)
Estudo No. 4 (1954)
Estudo No. 5 (1950)
Suite Mirim (1953)
Ponteios, Book III (1954–55)
Ponteios, Book IV (1956–57)
Ponteios, Book V (1958–59)
Sonatina No. 4 for Piano (1958)
Estudo No. 6 (1962)
Estudo No. 7 (1962)
Estudo No. 8 (1962)
Estudo No. 9 (1962)
Estudo No. 10 (1962)
Estudo No. 11 (1968)
Estudo No. 12 (1968)
Estudo No. 13 (1969)
Estudo No. 14 (1969)
Estudo No. 15 (1970)
Piano Sonata (1972)
Estudo No. 16 (1984)
Estudo No. 17 (1985)
Estudo No. 18 (1981)
Estudo No. 19 (1988)
Estudo No. 20 (1982)

Vocal
Cinco Poemas de Alice (1954) for Soprano and Piano

See also 
List of Brazilian musicians

References 

Sources

Further reading
Anon. n.d.a "Liner notes" for Naxos 8.572626, 8.572627
 Silva, Flávio. Camargo Guarnieri: o tempo e a música. Rio de Janeiro: Ministério da Cultura, FUNARTE; São Paulo, SP: Imprensa Official SP, 2001 .
 Verhaalen, Marion. Camargo Guarnieri, Brazilian Composer: A Study of his Creative Life and Works, with a preface by José Maria Neves. With CD recording. Bloomington: Indiana University Press, 2005. .

External links
About Camargo Guarnieri in Larousse
, Nelson Freire

1907 births
1993 deaths
People from Tietê, São Paulo
Brazilian people of Italian descent
Brazilian classical composers
Brazilian male composers
20th-century classical composers
Male classical composers
20th-century male musicians